The Peugeot Scoot'Elec was an electric motor scooter produced by Peugeot in France.

Launched in 1996, the Scoot'elec was based on the Zenith, with which it shares body panels and suspension parts.  It is powered by a  DC motor fed from three Saft nickel-cadmium monoblocs giving an 18 V, 100 A·h battery.  Built around a "double cradle", the frame holds the batteries low down between and behind the rider's feet, providing a very low centre of gravity.  The electronic controller and onboard charger are housed under the seat.

The scooter weighs .

The Scoot'Elec was discontinued in 2006; a replacement model, the E-Vivacity, was projected for 2011 release.

See also
Electric motorcycles and scooters
List of motorcycles by type of engine

References

External links
Official website (in French)

Electric scooters
Scoot'Elec